St Luke's Church, Hickling is a Grade I listed parish church in the Church of England in Hickling, Nottinghamshire.

History

It was built in the 14th century. The chancel was rebuilt in 1845, and the tower in 1873. A general restoration was carried out in 1886.

It is in a joint parish with two other churches of the same dedication:
St Luke's Church, Broughton Sulney
St Luke's Church, Kinoulton

Memorials

A brass on the chancel floor of 1521 to Master Ralph Babington, rector.

Organ

The church contains a pipe organ by Bryceson.  A specification of the organ can be found on the National Pipe Organ Register.

References

Church of England church buildings in Nottinghamshire
Grade I listed churches in Nottinghamshire